Tobias Holmqvist (born 23 January 1988) is a Swedish former footballer who played as a striker.

Career
Holmqvist played for Uppåkra between the ages of 6 and 13, before joining Helsingborg in January 2002. While with Helsingborg he spent loan spells at GAIS and Falkenberg. GAIS had wanted to sign Holmqvist on a permanent contract, but he elected to remain at Helsingborg as it was his boyhood club. He dropped down a division to sign for Hammarby in 2010 on the advice of his agent, in order to make more first-team appearances, taking a pay cut in the process. The next season, he dropped down a division again to sign for Lund, motivated in part due to homesickness. In 2012, he did not have a club, and instead worked at Team Sportia, a sports shop in Helsingborg. In 2015, he was playing for Högaborg in the Swedish fourth division.

References

External links 
 

1988 births
Living people
Swedish footballers
Helsingborgs IF players
GAIS players
Falkenbergs FF players
Hammarby Fotboll players
Lunds BK players
Högaborgs BK players
Allsvenskan players
Superettan players
Association football forwards